Nicaraguan Spanish is geographically defined as the form of Spanish spoken in Nicaragua. Affectionately, Nicaraguan Spanish is often called Nicañol.

The Spanish dialect in Nicaragua shares many similarities with that of its neighbors in the region, but it also has some stark differences in pronunciation and usage.

Nicaragua has the highest frequency, among Central American countries, of the use of voseo—use of the pronoun vos and its verb forms for the familiar second-person singular ("you"), in place of the tú of Standard Spanish. In this regard it is similar to the usage of Argentina and Uruguay in the Río de la Plata region of South America. Vos is used frequently in colloquial and familiar settings, but Nicaraguans also understand tuteo. The use of "vos" can be heard in television programs and can be seen in written form in publications.

In the North Caribbean Coast Autonomous Region and the South Caribbean Coast Autonomous Region, language and pronunciation is strongly influenced by Indigenous and creole languages such as Miskito, Rama, Sumo, Miskito Coastal Creole, Jamaican Patois, Garifuna and Rama Cay Creole but Spanish has become the main language spoken.

Origins
The Nicaraguan accent, like most New World Spanish, dates back to the 16th century in Andalusia. It shares later developments of Andalusian Spanish with that of Cuba, the Dominican Republic and the Caribbean/coastal regions of Venezuela, Colombia, Panama, Honduras and Puerto Rico. Nicaragua's relative isolation from Spain, however, and, to an extent, from other nations, fostered the development of the Nicaraguan accent, which did not change in the same ways that the Andalusian, Canarian, or other Spanish-American accents did.

During its history, Nicaraguan Spanish has acquired many indigenous influences and several distinguishing characteristics. Until the 19th century, a hybrid form of Nahuat-Spanish was the common language of Nicaragua. Today, Nahuat, Mangue and Mayan words, along with their respective syntax, can be found in everyday speech. Also, as Nicaragua was part of First Mexican Empire, there are a number of words widely used in Nicaragua which have Nahuatl, Mayan or other native origins, in particular names for flora, fauna and toponyms.

Pronunciation
Notable characteristics of Nicaraguan phonology include the following:
Seseo is common to Andalusian and Canarian Spanish varieties.
 Syllable-final  is realized as glottal  (except in the southern departments of Rio San Juan and Rivas, and in the formal speech, like TV broadcasts).
 Syllable final -aspiration occurs to a greater extent in Nicaraguan Spanish than in the other Central American dialects. Nicaraguans retain phrase-final  more often than Caribbean speakers, and rarely fully elide pre-consonantal .
  is realized as glottal .
 Intervocalic  often disappears; the ending -ado is often .
 Word-final  is pronounced velar .
The Costa Rican ice cream shop Pops, with franchises in other Central American countries, is pronounced in certain regions of Nicaragua as Pocs. Internet is sometimes pronounced * ; cenit is pronounced * ; laptop is pronounced * ; and robot pronounced * . This is sometimes extended to native Spanish words where such stops are found at the end of a syllable. For example, aceptar is sometimes pronounced * .
As Nicaragua was part of First Mexican Empire, Nicaraguan dialect adopted the voiceless alveolar affricate  and the cluster  (originally ) represented by the respective digraphs <tz> and <tl> in loanwords of Nahuatl origin, like quetzal and tlapalería  ('hardware store').

Second person singular pronouns

Vos
Vos is the predominant second person singular pronoun used by most speakers in familiar or informal contexts to address people in the same age group. Vos is also used by adults in addressing children or juveniles, but children address adults with usted.

Conjugations with the vos pronoun
Nicaraguan voseo is both pronominal and verbal; that is, speakers use the pronoun vos and the characteristic final-stressed verb forms. See Voseo

Affirmative Imperative
See Voseo Affirmative Imperative

The affirmative imperative in Nicaraguan voseo—like that of Rioplatense Spanish—places stress on the last syllable. For example, ¡Ven acá! or ¡Ven aquí! becomes ¡Vení!

Usted
Usted is the formal second person singular pronoun in Nicaraguan Spanish, as in almost all modern varieties of Spanish.  Usted is used in addressing elderly people, authorities, foreigners formally and in business settings. In contrast to neighboring Costa Rica, Nicaraguans are more inclined to address a casual acquaintance as vos, rather than usted.

Tú
Tú is hardly used in Nicaraguan Spanish, except in addressing foreigners familiarly, in speech or in writing. Due in part to the influence of Mexican, Colombian, and Venezuelan television programming, Nicaraguans are familiar with tuteo, and some television viewers, especially children, have begun to use it in limited contexts.

Vocabulary
A number of words widely used in Nicaragua which have Nahuatl, Mayan or other native origins, in particular names for flora, fauna and toponyms.  Some of these words are used in most, or all, Spanish-speaking countries, like chocolate and aguacate ("avocado"), and some are only used in Mexico and Nicaragua. The latter include guajolote "turkey" < Nahuatl huaxōlōtl  (although pavo is also used, as in other Spanish-speaking countries); papalote "kite" < Nahuatl pāpālōtl  "butterfly"; and jitomate "tomato" < Nahuatl xītomatl . For a more complete list see List of Spanish words of Nahuatl origin. Certain words that are present in Nicaraguan Spanish may not be immediately recognizable to non-Nicaraguans:
 : (adj.) It means to be worried, . Similar to "preocupado" or "afligido".
 : beer.
 : lazy.
 : friend, brother, companion.
 : a lot, a large quantity.
 : form of leather shoe typically worn and made by campesinos.
 : auto rickshaw, motorized tricycles.
 : adolescent or young person; child.
 : gnat, fruit flies.
 : balloon.
 : something unimportant; nonsense (usually as a comment in regard to someone's words).
 : turkey.
 : an all-purpose word that's loosely translated to mean “that” or “thing”
 : brat, punk; small child.
 : gossip.
 : baby of the family, the youngest son or daughter.
 : angry, furious, disgusted. Angrier than "arrecho".
 : angry as well. In the same intensity of "encachimbado".
 : hangover (estar de goma).
 : liquor, usually rum.
 : expression of surprise; means: What's up?.
 : baker's dozen (13 items) .
 : depending on context, it can refer to a friend, a third person (in a familiar manner), or be colloquially used to call someone a moron.
 , nicoya}}: (noun, colloquial) Nicaraguan.
 : drinking straw.
 : workplace or any job.
 : stingy, cheapskate 
 : (noun, colloquial) a Nicaraguan person.
 : grocery store.
 : (colloquial) awesome, impressive.
 : thief, crook.
 : liar or bigmouth.
 : very nice or pleasing, of high quality (often applied to clothing).
 : mosquito.

See also

Spanish language in the Americas
Central American Spanish
Seseo
Voseo

References

Further reading
Real Academia Española Diccionario Panhispánico de Dudas
History of Voseo
Lexicon of Nicaraguan Spanish
Dropping of S in word endings.

Central American Spanish